The 1985 European Athletics Indoor Championships were held at the Peace and Friendship Stadium, Piraeus, Attica, Greece, on 2 and 3 March 1985.

Medal summary

Men

Women

Medal table

Participating nations

  (10)
  (5)
  (13)
  (4)
  (21)
  (17)
  (2)
  (18)
  (17)
  (7)
  (12)
  (5)
  (21)
  (3)
  (5)
  (6)
  (14)
  (5)
  (7)
  (22)
  (22)
  (13)
  (8)
  (1)
  (26)
  (6)

See also
 1985 in athletics (track and field)

References
 Results - men at GBRathletics.com
 Results - women at GBRathletics.com
 EAA

 
European Athletics Indoor Championships
European Indoor Championships
Sports competitions in Piraeus
International athletics competitions hosted by Greece
European Athletics Indoor Championships
European Athletics Indoor Championships